Maurice Ville (30 October 1900 – 12 April 1982) was a French racing cyclist. He rode in the 1924 Tour de France, where he finished 2nd in stages 1 and 2, but dropped out on the 3rd stage. He also won the 1923 Volta a Catalunya and finished 2nd in the 1924 Paris–Roubaix.

Major results
1923
 1st  Overall Volta a Catalunya
1st Stages 1, 2 & 4
 1st Stage 1 Critérium du Midi
 1st Stage 2 Paris–Saint-Étienne
 2nd Circuit des villes d'eaux d'Auvergne
1924
 1st Tour du Vaucluse
 2nd Paris–Roubaix
 2nd Overall Criterium des Aiglons
 5th Paris–Tours
1927
 1st Stage 1 Volta a Catalunya
1928
 1st Paris–Contres

References

External links
 

1900 births
1982 deaths
French male cyclists
Sportspeople from Saint-Denis, Seine-Saint-Denis
Cyclists from Île-de-France